Danny Morris (PKA Mr. Morris) is an American songwriter and music producer. Morris has written songs for artists including Nicole Scherzinger (featuring 50 Cent), Wiz Khalifa, Pitbull (featuring Jamie Foxx), and Mary J. Blige (featuring Drake), among others. In 2011 Usher was awarded the Grammy Award for Best Male R&B Vocal Performance for the song "There Goes My Baby", which was co-written by Danny Morris. Danny Morris received a BMI Urban Award for the song. His work with Usher also includes the song "Lemme See", which reached the number one position on the Billboard Urban/R&B Chart, and was produced by Morris. In 2012 Lil Wayne received the Songwriter of the Year award at the Urban Awards for work that included his song "Motivation", co-written by Morris. The song was also awarded a 2012 Billboard Music Award.

In addition to songwriting, Morris has also performed as a keyboardist on the albums of artists including Eminem, Usher, Fantasia, Nelly, and Yelawolf. He has also worked as a producer on albums by Nelly and Monica. Morris was signed as a producer and songwriter with Jim Jonsin's Rebel Rock Entertainment, from 2010 to 2013.

Awards and nominations
 "There Goes My Baby" (Usher) – 2010 BMI Award for songwriting
 "Motivation" (Kelly Rowland, Lil Wayne) – 2011 BMI Award for songwriting
 "There Goes My Baby" (Usher) – Billboard#1 Urban Radio Award 2010 for songwriting
 "Motivation" (Kelly Rowland, Lil Wayne) – Billboard#1 Urban Radio Award 2011 for songwriting
 "Motivation" (Kelly Rowland, Lil Wayne) - 2012 Billboard Music Award – Best R&B Song

Singles

References

Living people
American male songwriters
American record producers
Year of birth missing (living people)